Posada Jaćmierska Górna  is a village in the administrative district of Gmina Zarszyn, within Sanok County, Podkarpackie Voivodeship, in south-eastern Poland.

References

Villages in Sanok County